André Reinaldo de Souza Esposito, better known simply as Andrezinho (born 11 August 1982, in Santo André) is a Brazilian professional footballer who plays for Sabah FA in Malaysian Premier League.

Career
He started playing in Brazil with Matsubara in 1999, before joining Fluminense.

Fluminense

1999–2005

With Flu he won the Oberndorf Tournament Under-19 in 2001 scoring on the final against VfB Stuttgart and the Campeonato Carioca in 2002.

Asia and Europe

In August 2002 he went on trial to Russian FC Spartak Moscow, but left the club after three days and returned to Fluminense until 2005 when he leaves to Malaysia, where he played with Sabah FA. Between 2006 and 2009, He played in Kuwait, first with Kazma Sporting Club where he won the following titles: Al khurafi Cup and Al Hasawy Super Cup and then with Al Salmiya Club qualifying with the club to the Asian Football Confederation. In 2009, he had a short spell in Lebanon with Al-Ansar SC before moving in January 2010 back to Europe to play in Serbian SuperLiga with FK Borac Čačak. From there, Andrezinho returned to acting in the Middle East, more precisely to Iran, where defending Foolad FC for two seasons. In 2012, the player move to island of Malta becoming part of Tarxien Rainbows FC club with which he broke the fastest goal record of League Maltese on 27 April 2013, with just 20 seconds of play, and attending the best campaign of all time from the foundation club,  In 2014, Andre returned to Brazil and sign with Ipatinga FC to play the Campeonato Mineiro.  In 2014, he returned to Malaysia to defend the red T-shirt of Rhinos again with Sabah FA. but fail to impress the team due to discipline problem and being unpaid for 5 months salary.

References

External sources
 

1982 births
Living people
Brazilian footballers
Brazilian expatriate sportspeople in Malaysia
Brazilian expatriate footballers
Fluminense FC players
Sabah F.C. (Malaysia) players
Expatriate footballers in Malaysia
Kazma SC players
Al Salmiya SC players
Expatriate footballers in Kuwait
Al Ansar FC players
Expatriate footballers in Lebanon
FK Borac Čačak players
Serbian SuperLiga players
Expatriate footballers in Serbia
Association football midfielders
Brazilian expatriate sportspeople in Kuwait
Foolad FC players
Expatriate footballers in Iran
Brazilian expatriate sportspeople in Lebanon
Tarxien Rainbows F.C. players
Expatriate footballers in Malta
Lebanese Premier League players
Kuwait Premier League players